The Detectives (also known as The Detectives Starring Robert Taylor, Captain of Detectives, and Robert Taylor's Detectives) is an American crime drama series which ran on ABC during its first two seasons (sponsored by Procter & Gamble), and on NBC during its third and final season. The series, starring motion picture star Robert Taylor, was produced by Four Star Television in association with Levy-Gardner-Laven Productions.

Synopsis
Taylor stars as Detective Captain Matt Holbrook, the tough, no-nonsense head of an elite police investigative unit in a major U.S. city. Ostensibly, each man in Holbrook's hand-picked squad of detectives came from a different division. Lt. Johnny Russo (Tige Andrews) was from burglary, Lt. Jim Conway (Lee Farr) came from homicide, and Lt. Otto Lindstrom (Russell Thorson) was from the bunco squad.

Production
In the series' second season, Farr left the series and was replaced by Mark Goddard as Detective Sgt. Chris Ballard. Future Batman star Adam West joined the cast during the third season as Sgt. Steve Nelson. The series moved to NBC for its third season and was increased from 30 to 60 minutes. The series was also retitled to Robert Taylor's Detectives. A total of 97 episodes were produced before the series was cancelled in 1962. The series was produced for Four Star by Levy-Gardner-Laven Productions, which produced other successful Four Star series, such as The Rifleman and The Big Valley.

Future Star Trek creator Gene Roddenberry was a contributing writer to the series.

Cast
 Robert Taylor as Det. Capt. Matt Holbrook
 Tige Andrews as Lt. John "Johnny" Russo
 Russell Thorson as Lt. Otto Lindstrom (1959-1961)
 Lee Farr as Lt. James "Jimmy" Conway (1959-1960)
 Mark Goddard as Sgt. Chris Ballard (1960-1962)
 Ursula Thiess as Lisa Bonay (1960-1961)
 Adam West as Sgt. Steve Nelson (1961-1962)

Guest stars

 Philip Abbott
 Ellen Burstyn
 Dyan Cannon
 James Coburn
 John Considine
 Yvonne Craig
 Robert Culp
 Ronnie Dapo
 Donna Douglas
 Jena Engstrom
 Bill Erwin
 Eva Gabor
 Bruce Gordon
 Frank Gorshin
 Marianna Hill
 Marsha Hunt
 Martin Landau
 Scott Marlowe

 Vera Miles
 George Mitchell
 Mary Murphy 
 Jay North 
 Cathy O'Donnell
 Jerry Paris 
 Pernell Roberts
 Chris Robinson
 Edward G. Robinson
 Fay Spain
 Inger Stevens
 William Tannen
 Joan Taylor
 Lawrence Tierney
 Dawn Wells
 Adam West
 William Windom
 Dianne Foster

Episodes

Season 1: 1959–60

Season 2: 1960–61

Season 3: 1961–62

Release

Syndication 
In syndication, the series was rebroadcast for a time under the name, Captain of Detectives. Rebroadcasts were shown in the early 2000s on cable's TV Land network.

Home media 
The Detectives has been released in Germany (in dubbed German language only) under the name "Kein Fall für FBI"  As of 2019, there has been no official release of Robert Taylor's "The Detectives" on DVD in the U.S.

Other media

Paperback Novel 
Prolific pulpsmith Norman A. Daniels was tapped by Lancer Books to write an original novel based on the series' concept and characters, and the book, named for the series, was released in 1962, with a cover price of 35¢, its copyright assigned to the author. It manages to sport all three iterations of the title: The cover, beneath a close-up photo of the star's eyes, says Robert Taylor starring in The Detectives; the spine says merely The Detectives and then cites the author; the title page proclaims Robert Taylor's Detectives.

Comic book 
Dell Comics issued a comic book rendition of Robert Taylor's "The Detectives" during the series run .

Related
A few years after The Detectives ended, Barbara Stanwyck, Robert Taylor's ex-wife, had her very own successful series also produced by Four Star/Levy-Gardner-Laven Productions, The Big Valley, which also aired on ABC.

Several cast members on The Detectives went on to major TV roles after the series ended:
Robert Taylor, series star of The Detectives, who played Det.Capt. Matt Holbrook, went on to star in the successful syndicated TV series Death Valley Days, where he remained until his death in 1969. He had enjoyed a long and successful film career as a leading man in over 70 films- prior to starring in The Detectives.
 Adam West, who was added to the cast in The Detectives''' final season as Det. Steve Nelson, went on to play the lead role in the ABC series Batman.
 Tige Andrews, who played Det. Johnny Russo, went on to play as Police Detective Captain Adam Greer in ABC's The Mod Squad.  He also appeared in the original Star Trek as Klingon officer Kras in the episode "Friday's Child".
 Mark Goddard, who played Det. Chris Ballard, went on to star in the CBS sci-fi series Lost In Space. Prior to the Detectives, Goddard co-starred in the popular (but cancelled after one season), CBS-TV series, Johnny Ringo, also produced by Four Star.
 Russell Thorson, who played Det. Otto Lindstrom, had a long list of film and TV credits before and after The Detectives, including the TV movie "Cocoon", the pilot episode of the original TV series Hawaii Five-O starring Jack Lord .

References

External links

  
 The Detectives starring Robert Taylor - Series Info and Episode Guide
 Amazon Customer Discussions- The Detectives-Starring Robert Taylor
 The Detectives opening sequence (with syndicated name/logo "Captain Of Detectives"- YouTube
 The Detectives closing sequence as originally broadcast - YouTube
 The Shuttle The Detectives'' complete season 2 episode
 Terror on Ice The Detectives: with Robert Taylor, Russell Thorson, Tige Andrews, and Mark Goddard
Audio Narrative of The Detectives

1950s American crime drama television series
1960s American crime drama television series
1959 American television series debuts
1962 American television series endings
American Broadcasting Company original programming
Black-and-white American television shows
English-language television shows
NBC original programming
Television series by Four Star Television
Television series by 20th Century Fox Television
American detective television series